Marble Creek is a stream in Iron and Madison Counties in the U.S. state of Missouri. It is a tributary of the St. Francis River.

Marble Creek was so named because the limestone in the stream bed had the appearance of marble.

See also
List of rivers of Missouri

References

Rivers of Iron County, Missouri
Rivers of Madison County, Missouri
Rivers of Missouri